Antichloris flammea is a moth of the family Erebidae. It was described by Paul Dognin in 1891. It is found in Ecuador, Bolivia and Colombia.

References

Moths described in 1891
Euchromiina
Moths of South America